The Special Constables Act 1923 (13 and 14 Geo. V, c. 11; full title - An Act to make perpetual, subject to an amendment, the Special Constables Act, 1914; to provide for the employment of special constables in connection with Naval, Military and Air Force yards and stations ; and to remove certain limitations on the appointment of special constables in Scotland.) was a British act of parliament passed in 1923. It made permanent an earlier act on special constables passed in 1914. Words and sections from the Act were repealed by the Police (Scotland) Act 1956 and the Police Act 1964 and - though it has not been repealed in its entirety - none of its Sections are now in effect.

Its Section 1 effectively repealed the phrase "during the present war" from the Special Constables Act 1914 and the reference to that act in the First Schedule to the War Emergency Laws (Continuance) Act, 1920, though in both respects it exempted Northern Ireland. Its Section 2 set up a procedure whereby any Orders in Council made under the 1914 Act as modified by the 1923 Act would be put before "both Houses of Parliament as soon as may be after it is made". A member of either House then had 21 sitting days after that date to lay an address before the Crown for the repeal of any regulations made by that Order in Council. Such regulations would be made void "without prejudice to the validity of any proceedings which may in the meantime have been taken thereunder or to the making of any new regulations provided that Orders in Council under the said Act shall not be deemed to be statutory rules within the meaning of section one of the Rules Publication Act, 1893."

Its Section 3 replaced Metropolitan Police policing of dockyards and military bases with special constables, to be nominated by the Admiralty, Army Council or Air Council and confirmed by two justices of the peace (England and Wales), magistrates of a burgh (Scotland) or standing joint committee of a county (Scotland), with all the same powers Metropolitan Police constables had had in those places under the Metropolitan Police Act 1860 or the Metropolitan Police (Employment in Scotland) Act, 1914. Such special constables remained under the control of the department which had nominated them, which also had power to suspend or terminate their appointment as a special constable. This led to the establishment of the Royal Marine Police, the Army Department Constabulary and the Air Ministry Constabulary over the course of the 1920s - these were later all subsumed into the Ministry of Defence Police.

Its Section 4 applied Section 96 of the Burgh Police (Scotland) Act, 1892 and its extension by the Special Constables (Scotland) Act, 1914 to the 1923 Act, but set the age as between 20 and 50 rather than those two Acts' 26 and over. Its Section 5 set its short title as "Special Constables Act, 1923, and the Special Constables Act, 1914".

References

Police legislation in the United Kingdom
1923 in law
United Kingdom Acts of Parliament 1923